The North American Association of Indian Students (NAAIS) is a nonprofit and non-partisan Indian-American organization that functions as an umbrella group to cater to Indian and Indian-American students studying in the United States and Canada. The organization has 23,000 members and aims to connect the variety of Indian groups on college and university campuses to create better resources of Indian and Indian-American students. With over 200,000 Indian students and over 500,000 Indian-American students studying in US institutions, young Indians are one of the largest identity groups within the United States, behind China.In early 2020, NAAIS partnered with Radio Mirchi to set up a phone helpline for Indian students impacted by the effects of the COVID-19 pandemic. The helpline has supported students in answering questions about visa status, travel restrictions, and university closures. Post the success of the program, the organization was reported to play a key part in helping Indian-origin students in the United States and Canada.

Programs and Initiatives

Mentorship Program 
The NAAIS mentorship program is a student-led initiative that aims to connect Indian-origin/Indian-American/Indian undergraduate students with experienced Indian alumni mentors. The program encourages support of Indian individuals from underrepresented backgrounds including but not limited to non-Hindu, LGBTQIA+, low-income, and non-professional students through mentorship.

Partnership with ZEE5 
ZEE5 created a strategic partnership with NAAIS to engage more young Indians around college campuses in the Summer and Fall of 2021. The partnership was announced by Priyanka Chopra and Chief Business Officer, Archana Anand. As of November 2021, the partnership program had visited over 50 college campuses in the United States, as claimed by both organizations.

The India Workshop Series 
NAAIS has created a workshop series to help form stronger, lasting bonds between Indian-origin students within India.

Civic Engagement 
NAAIS also engages with increasing civic engagement of Indians in the United States.

References

Organizations based in New York City
Organisations based in Delhi
University organizations
Indian-American culture in New York (state)
Indian-American culture
Nonprofit youth organizations based in the United States
Nonpartisan organizations in the United States
Ethnic student organizations
Student organizations
Student organizations by university or college in the United States
Student organizations by university or college
Student societies in the United States